Rokeby is a historic home located at King George, King George County, Virginia. The original section was built about 1828, and is a two-story, three bay Federal style brick dwelling. It has a low hipped roof, tripartite windows, lintel-type
window heads, and elliptical, leaded-glass fanlight with flanking sidelights.  The original block was
enlarged about 1912 by a pair of flanking two-story, frame pavilions, and in 1917, the west wing was substantially enlarged. Also on the property are the contributing antebellum smokehouse and a complex of buildings built in 1917-1920: (1) schoolhouse; (2) summer / tenant house; (3) playhouse; (4) garage; (5) Sears, Roebuck catalog-ordered horse barn; (6) sheep barn; and (7) cattle run-in shed.

It was listed on the National Register of Historic Places in 2005.

References

Houses on the National Register of Historic Places in Virginia
Federal architecture in Virginia
Houses completed in 1828
Houses in King George County, Virginia
National Register of Historic Places in King George County, Virginia